Harperspace is a 2000 album from UK singer-songwriter Nick Harper.  It was produced by Glenn Tilbrook and released on Tilbrook's own Quixotic label.

Critical reception
The Herald wrote that "with added instrumentation on disc, the rockier songs kick along and the more reflective material glows." The Guardian called the album Harper's "strongest yet, from the quirky lyricism of 'The Verse That Time Forgot' to the witty acoustic psychedelia of 'Aeroplane'."

Track listing
 "The Verse Time Forgot"
 "Happy Man"
 "Aeroplane"
 "Karmageddon"
 "Roomspin"
 "There is Magic in this World"
 "Nothing But Love"
 "Watching The Stars"
 "Kettledrum Heart"
 "She Rules My World"
 "Song of Madness"
 "Before They Put Me in the Ground"

Personnel
Nick Harper - acoustic guitar, vocals
Glenn Tilbrook - guitar, bass, keyboards, executive producer
Andy Metcalfe, - bass, keyboards, engineering and mixing
Ben Jones - bass, keyboards
Ash Soan - drums
Lawrence Davies - French horn
Liquid Grooves, Shawn Lee - loops
Paul Weston, Steve Cripps - "commotional approbatative spectrographics"  
Lily Harper - "supreme being"

References

2000 albums
Nick Harper albums